The 2015 Buffalo Lightning season was the first season for the American Indoor Football (AIF) expansion franchise, and their first season in the AIF.

Schedule

Regular season

Standings

Roster

References

Buffalo Lightning
Buffalo Lightning
Buffalo Blitz